John Paul Reynolds (born August 5, 1991) is an American actor and writer. He is known for his starring role in the series Search Party (2016–2022) and his recurring role on Stranger Things (2016–present). Reynolds also starred in the miniseries Four Weddings and a Funeral in 2019. Born in Madison, Wisconsin, he began his career at the Annoyance Theatre in Chicago.

Career 
Reynolds began his career in Chicago at the age of 18. He graduated from the IO Training Center and the Second City Conservatory in Chicago, and performed regularly at IO Chicago, The Annoyance, Chemically Imbalanced Comedy, The Playground, and Upstairs Gallery. He was also a part of the Kill All Comedy collective along with comedians Conner O'Malley and Gary Richardson.

Reynolds has said he based his Search Party character Drew Gardner on his experience growing up in the Midwest: "I grew up in Madison, Wisconsin, and I based him as a guy I would know in the Midwest who sees his brothers grow up a certain way, and wants to maintain that status quo with his family, and doesn’t want to be in any spotlight."

Filmography

Film

Television

References

External links

American male film actors
American male television actors
Living people
21st-century American male actors
1991 births
People from Madison, Wisconsin